The Cyberspace Administration of China (CAC) is the central internet regulator, censor, oversight, and control agency for the People's Republic of China. Under the arrangement "one institution with two names", it is the external name of the Office of the Central Cyberspace Affairs Commission of the Chinese Communist Party.

Structure 
The CAC includes the following departments: an Internet Security Emergency Command Center, an Agency Service Center, and an Illegal and Unhealthy Information Reporting Center. The CAC is the majority owner of the China Internet Investment Fund, which has ownership stakes in technology firms such as ByteDance, Weibo Corporation, SenseTime, and Kuaishou.

The CAC is involved in the formulation and implementation of policy on a variety of issues related to the Chinese Internet. It is under direct jurisdiction of the Central Cyberspace Affairs Commission, a party institution subordinate to the Central Committee of the Chinese Communist Party. The Director of both the state and party institutions is Zhuang Rongwen, who serves concurrently as the Deputy Head of the party's Central Propaganda Department.

The efforts of the CAC have been linked with a broader push by the Xi Jinping administration, characterized by Xiao Qiang, head of the U.S.-based China Digital Times, as a "ferocious assault on civil society." This has included forced confessions of television journalists, military parades, harsh media censorship and more. The CAC additionally organizes the World Internet Conference.

The CAC also maintains some censorship functions, including issuing directives to media companies in China. After a campaign to arrest almost 200 lawyers and activists in China, the CAC published a directive saying that "All websites must, without exception, use as the standard official and authoritative media reports with regards to the detention of trouble-making lawyers by the relevant departments."

Lu Wei, until 2016 the head of the CAC, was previously the head of the Beijing Propaganda Department, and oversaw the Internet Management Office, a "massive human effort" that involved over 60,000 Internet propaganda workers and two million others employed off-payroll. It was this experience that assisted General Secretary Xi Jinping in selecting Lu as the head of the newly formed Internet regulator, the CAC.

Policies 

Among the areas the CAC regulates include usernames on the Chinese Internet, the appropriateness of remarks made online, virtual private networks, the content of Internet portals, and much more.

According to a draft Cyber Security Law, made public on July 6, 2015, the CAC works with other Chinese regulators to formulate a catalog of "key network equipment" and "specialized network security products" for certification. The CAC is also involved in reviewing the procurement of network products or services for national security considerations. Data stored outside of China by Chinese companies is also required to undergo CAC approval.

According to state media outlet Xinhua, the CAC was responsible for issuing a "voluntary pledge" that was intended to be adhered to by the major Internet portals in China about the comments that would or would not be allowed to be made on their website. Among the categories of comments that were banned, included were those that "harmed national security," "harmed the nation's honor or interest," "damaged the nation's religious policies," "spread rumors, disturbed public order," and "intentionally using character combinations to avoid censorship."

In 2015, the CAC was also responsible for chasing down Internet users and web sites that published "rumors" following an explosion in the port city of Tianjin. Such rumors included claims that blasts killed 1,000 people, or that there was looting, or leadership ructions as a result of the blast. The same year, the CAC debuted a song that Paul Mozur of The New York Times called "a throwback to revolutionary songs glorifying the state." The song included the lines: “Unified with the strength of all living things, Devoted to turning the global village into the most beautiful scene” and “An Internet power: Tell the world that the Chinese Dream is uplifting China.”

The CAC has been given the responsibility for reviewing the security of devices made by foreign countries.

In May 2020, the CAC announced a campaign to "clean up" online political and religious content deemed "illegal."

In July 2020, CAC commenced a three-month censorship action on We-Media in China.

In December 2020, CAC removed 105 apps, including that of Tripadvisor, from China's app stores that were deemed "illegal" in a move to "clean up China's internet".

In 2021, CAC launched a hotline to report online comments against the Chinese Communist Party, including comments which it deemed "historical nihilism." In 2022, CAC published rules that mandate that all online comments must be pre-reviewed before being published.

During the 2022 COVID-19 protests in China, the CAC directed companies such as Tencent and ByteDance to intensify their censorship efforts.

In January 2023, CAC ordered any content displaying "gloomy emotions" to be censored during Lunar New Year celebrations as part of its "Spring Festival internet environment rectification" campaign.

Reception 

The CAC has been accused of assisting in cyber attacks against visitors to Chinese websites. The anti-censorship group GreatFire.org provided data and reports showing man-in-the-middle attacks against major foreign web services, including iCloud, Yahoo, Microsoft, and Google. The attack would have required the ability to "tap into the backbone of the Chinese Internet."

Gibson Research Corporation attributed some of the attacks against GitHub to the CAC's operations. In the attack, ads hosted on Baidu were able to leverage computers visiting from outside China, redirecting their traffic to overload the servers of GitHub. "The tampering takes places someplace between when the traffic enters China and when it hits Baidu's servers," Gibson wrote. "This is consistent with previous malicious actions and points to the Cyberspace Administration of China (CAC) being directly involved..."

A 2020 investigation by ProPublica and The New York Times found that CAC systematically placed censorship restrictions on Chinese media outlets and social media to avoid mentions of the COVID-19 outbreak, mentions of Li Wenliang, and "activated legions of fake online commenters to flood social sites with distracting chatter".

See also 
 Roskomnadzor

References

External links 
 

Internet censorship in China
Government agencies of China
Institutions of the Central Committee of the Chinese Communist Party
One institution with multiple names